Little Canada is a city in Ramsey County, Minnesota, United States. It is a second-ring suburb of Minneapolis-Saint Paul. The population was 10,819 at the 2020 census.

History
In 1844, French Canadian settler Benjamin Gervais moved north from Saint Paul to claim land in order to build the first grist mill in Minnesota that was independent from the government.  Today, the large lake on the east side of Little Canada bears his name (Lake Gervais). The grist mill was converted into a park, which is recognized as the birthplace of the city.  Little Canada began as the township of New Canada in 1858. In the 1950s the township was threatened by the suburban sprawl of the ensuing larger communities that were formed, such as Maplewood.  In 1953, the city leaders came together and established the village of Little Canada. It became a city in 1974.

Canadian Ties
The city displays the Canadian influence in its history in several ways. Its official symbol is an initial LC on a white fleur-de-lis with a red Maple Leaf background, and the Canadian flag is displayed in council chambers.

In early August the city hosts an annual celebration, Canadian Days, with its sister city Thunder Bay, Ontario, in Canada.

Sister city
  Thunder Bay, Ontario since 1977

Geography

Interstate Highway 35E, Interstate Highway 694, and Minnesota Highway 36 are three of the main routes in the city.  Nearby places include Maplewood, Roseville, Shoreview, Vadnais Heights, White Bear Lake, and Saint Paul.

Little Canada has a number of parks and trails, including Pioneer Park, Spooner Park, Gervais Mill Park, Nadeau Wildlife Park, and the upcoming Veterans Memorial Park.

Demographics

2010 census
As of the census of 2010, there were 9,773 people, 4,393 households, and 2,361 families living in the city. The racial makeup of the city was 74.6% White, 6.6% African American, 0.5% Native American, 13.1% Asian, 2.7% from other races, and 2.5% from two or more races. Hispanic or Latino of any race were 5.8% of the population.

There were 4,393 households, of which 24.4% had children under the age of 18 living with them, 38.7% were married couples living together, 10.7% had a female householder with no husband present, 4.3% had a male householder with no wife present, and 46.3% were non-families. 37.6% of all households were made up of individuals, and 13.6% had someone living alone who was 65 years of age or older. The average household size was 2.21 and the average family size was 2.96.

The median age in the city was 39.7 years. 19.5% of residents were under the age of 18; 10.9% were between the ages of 18 and 24; 25.4% were from 25 to 44; 29.3% were from 45 to 64; and 14.7% were 65 years of age or older. The gender makeup of the city was 47.8% male and 52.2% female.

2000 census
As of the census of 2000, there were 9,771 people, 4,375 households, and 2,393 families living in the city. The racial makeup of the city was 85.38% White, 4.20% African American, 0.58% Native American, 6.68% Asian, 0.01% Pacific Islander, 0.90% from other races, and 2.25% from two or more races. Hispanic or Latino of any race were 2.29% of the population.

There were 4,375 households, out of which 26.0% had children under the age of 18 living with them, 41.6% were married couples living together, 10.1% had a female householder with no husband present, and 45.3% were non-families. 36.0% of all households were made up of individuals, and 11.1% had someone living alone who was 65 years of age or older.  The average household size was 2.23 and the average family size was 2.96.

In the city, the population was spread out, with 22.1% under the age of 18, 11.0% from 18 to 24, 31.2% from 25 to 44, 22.8% from 45 to 64, and 12.9% who were 65 years of age or older.  The median age was 36 years. For every 100 females, there were 91.3 males.  For every 100 females age 18 and over, there were 90.2 males.

The median income for a household in the city was $46,609, and the median income for a family was $61,082. Males had a median income of $41,205 versus $31,689 for females. The per capita income for the city was $25,624.  About 4.6% of families and 5.5% of the population were below the poverty line, including 5.2% of those under age 18 and 3.4% of those age 65 or over.

Government
Little Canada is a Minnesota "Plan-A" (Council/Administrator) statutory city with a five-member council including the mayor. Little Canada elects its mayor every two years in each statewide general election. Council Members are elected at-large in a staggered cycle, two every two years. Terms are four years and also occur during statewide general elections.

Mayor

John Keis is the current mayor of Little Canada. Keis, a longtime community member, is a Senior Technology Lead with Ameriprise Financial. Keis served on the Council from 2006 to 2014. Prior to that he served on the Planning Commission from 1991 to 2004. Keis was elected after running unopposed in the 2014 election and succeeded Bill Blesener, who died on December 21, 2014. Blesener died of cancer at the age of 74, and had served as mayor from 2005 until his death.

City Council

 Rick Montour
 Michael McGraw
 Tom Fischer
 Christian Torkelson

Parks and Recreation Commission
Dave Miller - Chair 
Anna Abruzzese
Rose Chu
Shawn Hipp
Ron Horwath
Mike Mui
Peter Schletty

Education
Little Canada is served mostly by the Roseville Area School District (ISD 623) with a small section of the city north of Interstate 694 served by the White Bear Lake School District. The two schools within city limits are Little Canada Elementary and Roseville Area Middle School.

See also
 Little Canada (term)

References

External links
 Little Canada, MN – Official Website

Cities in Minnesota
Cities in Ramsey County, Minnesota
French-Canadian American history
French-Canadian culture in Minnesota
Populated places established in 1953